This article contains a list of fossil-bearing stratigraphic units in the state of Washington, U.S.

Sites

See also

 Paleontology in Washington (state)

References

 

Washington
Stratigraphic units
Stratigraphy of Washington (state)
Washington (state) geography-related lists
United States geology-related lists